Badi Chaupar is a metro station on the Pink Line of the Jaipur Metro in the City of Jaipur, capital of the Indian state of Rajasthan. The station officially opened on 23 September 2020.

History

Station layout

Connections

Entry and exits

See also

References

Jaipur Metro stations
Railway stations in India opened in 2020

